Mary McLaughlin may refer to:
 Mary A. McLaughlin (born 1946), American judge
 Mary Ann McLaughlin, American cardiologist
 Mary C. McLaughlin (died 2014), American public health official
 Mary Louise McLaughlin (1847-1939), American ceramics painter and potter
Mary McLaughlin (footballer), American player with the Vancouver Whitecaps
 Mary McLaughlin (model), 1957 Vogue cover model
Mary McLaughlin (musician), artist with Gourd Music